Orphan is a 2009 psychological horror film directed by Jaume Collet-Serra and written by David Leslie Johnson from a story by Alex Mace. The film stars Vera Farmiga, Peter Sarsgaard, Isabelle Fuhrman, CCH Pounder and Jimmy Bennett. The plot centers on a couple who, after the death of their unborn child, adopt a psychopathic nine-year-old girl with a mysterious past.

The film is an international co-production between the United States, Canada, Germany and France. It was produced by Joel Silver and Susan Downey of Dark Castle Entertainment, and Leonardo DiCaprio and Jennifer Davisson Killoran of Appian Way Productions. Principal photography for the film took place in Canada, in the cities of St. Thomas, Toronto, Port Hope, and Montreal.

Orphan was released in the United States on July 24, 2009, by Warner Bros. Pictures. The film received mixed reviews from critics, who praised its dark humor, scares and Fuhrman's performance as Esther, but criticized its formulaic screenplay, uneven pacing and two-hour runtime. The film grossed $78 million worldwide against a $20 million budget. A prequel, titled Orphan: First Kill, was released in 2022, with Fuhrman reprising her role.

Plot
Kate and John Coleman's marriage is strained after the stillbirth of their third child, Jessica, whose loss is particularly hard on Kate, a recovering alcoholic. She and John decide to adopt a 9-year-old Russian girl, Esther, from St. Mariana's Home for Girls, a local orphanage. Their 5-year-old deaf daughter, Max, embraces Esther, but their 12-year-old son, Daniel, is less welcoming.

One night, Kate and John begin to have sex until Esther interrupts them. Kate becomes suspicious when Esther expresses far more knowledge of sex than expected of a child her age. Esther then exhibits hostile behavior in front of Max and Daniel, such as killing an injured pigeon and badly injuring a classmate who was bullying her. Sister Abigail, the head of the orphanage, visits the household, warning Kate and John that tragic events and incidents occur around Esther, including the house fire that killed her last adoptive family. When Sister Abigail leaves, Esther causes her to crash her car on the road and then bludgeons her to death with a hammer. She forces Max to help her move the body and then hides the evidence in Daniel's treehouse. Daniel sees them at the treehouse, and later that night, she interrogates him about what he saw, threatening to castrate him if he tells Kate and John.

As Kate becomes further convinced about Esther's unusual behavior, John believes she is being paranoid and tells Esther to do something nice for Kate. Esther rips out the flowers from Jessica's grave and gives them to Kate as a bouquet. Kate is horrified and roughly grabs Esther's arm in distress, asserting that she did this on purpose. That night, Esther breaks her own arm and falsely blames Kate, causing further strife in Kate and John's marriage. The next day, Esther releases the brake in the car, causing it to roll into oncoming traffic with Max inside. She also points out the wine she found in the kitchen, causing John and Kate's therapist to suggest Kate return to rehab, with John threatening to leave her and take the children if she refuses. Kate discovers that Esther came from an Estonian mental hospital named the Saarne Institute, and the orphanage she claims she was from has no record of her.

When Daniel learns about Sister Abigail's death from Max and searches the treehouse, Esther sets it on fire and attempts to kill him but is thwarted by Max. Daniel is seriously injured, and while in the hospital in ICU, Esther tries to smother him to death with a pillow, but doctors revive him. Kate, enraged, slaps Esther before she is restrained and sedated. That night, Esther dresses provocatively and attempts to seduce John, who threatens to send Esther back to the orphanage after realizing Kate had been right about Esther's behavior.

At the hospital, Kate is contacted by Dr. Värava of the Saarne Instituute and learns that Esther is actually a 33-year-old woman named Leena Klammer, born in Estonia. She has hypopituitarism, a rare hormonal disorder that stunted her physical growth and caused proportional dwarfism, and she has spent most of her life posing as a little girl. Leena is violent and has murdered at least seven people. The ribbons she wears around her neck and wrists conceal the livid scars she received from trying to break out of straitjackets during her time at the asylum.  After failing to seduce John, Leena removes her disguise and trashes her room in a fury, then stabs him to death. 

Kate rushes home, and Leena attempts to shoot her, wounding her arm. After Leena opens fire on Max, Kate breaks through the greenhouse roof and knocks Leena unconscious.  Kate and Max flee as police arrive, but Leena attacks Kate near the frozen pond, hurling them onto the ice. Max tries to shoot Leena but shatters the ice instead, sending Leena and Kate underwater. Kate begins to climb out, with Leena clinging to her legs. Leena reverts to her Esther persona, begging "Mommy" not to let her die, while hiding a knife behind her back. Kate retorts angrily that she is not Leena's mother and kicks her in the face, breaking her neck. Leena's body sinks into the dark pond as Kate and Max are met by the police.

Cast

Production

Vera Farmiga and Peter Sarsgaard were cast in main roles in late November 2007. Principal photography for the film took place in Canada, in the cities of St. Thomas, Toronto, Port Hope, and Montreal.

Esther of Estonia was inspired by the May 2007 media coverage of 34-year-old Barbora Skrlová, an orphan who abused her first adoptive family and ran away from the police when caught. She eventually was found impersonating Adam, a thirteen-year-old boy who had gone missing.

Release

Theatrical
Orphan had its world premiere in Westwood, Los Angeles on July 21, 2009. The following day, it screened at the Fantasia International Film Festival in Montreal, Canada. The film was released theatrically in North America on July 24, 2009. It was then released in the United Kingdom on August 7, 2009 by Optimum Releasing.

Home media
Orphan was released on DVD and Blu-ray on October 27, 2009 in the United States by Warner Home Video and in the United Kingdom on November 27, 2009 by Optimum Releasing. The DVD includes deleted scenes, and the alternate ending. The opening previews also contain a public service announcement describing the plight of unadopted children in the United States and encouraging domestic adoption.

Reception

Box office
The film opened in the 4th spot at the box office, making a total of $12.8 million, behind G-Force, Harry Potter and the Half-Blood Prince, and The Ugly Truth. The film went on to gross a worldwide total of $78.3 million.

Critical response

On review aggregator Rotten Tomatoes, the film holds an approval rating of 58% based on 161 reviews, with an average rating of 5.60/10. The website's critics consensus read, "While it has moments of dark humor and the requisite scares, Orphan fails to build on its interesting premise and degenerates into a formulaic, sleazy horror/thriller." On Metacritic the film has a weighted average score of 42 out of 100, based on 25 critics, indicating "mixed or average reviews". Audiences polled by CinemaScore gave the film an average grade of "B−" on an A+ to F scale.

Roger Ebert of the Chicago Sun-Times gave Orphan 3 stars out of 4, writing: "After seeing 'Orphan,' I now realize that Damien of 'The Omen' was a model child. The Demon Seed was a bumper crop. Rosemary would have been happy to have this baby. Here is a shamelessly effective horror film based on the most diabolical of movie malefactors, a child. You want a good horror film about a child from hell, you got one." Mick LaSalle of the San Francisco Chronicle also gave a positive review, commenting: "Orphan provides everything you might expect in a psycho-child thriller, but with such excess and exuberance that it still has the power to surprise." Todd McCarthy of Variety was less impressed, writing: "Teasingly enjoyable rubbish through the first hour, Orphan becomes genuine trash during its protracted second half."

Manohla Dargis of The New York Times wrote: "Actors have to eat like the rest of us, if evidently not as much, but you still have to wonder how the independent film mainstays Vera Farmiga and Peter Sarsgaard ended up wading through Orphan and, for the most part, not laughing." Owen Gleiberman of Entertainment Weekly gave the film a D+ score, noting: "Orphan isn't scary – it's garish and plodding." Keith Phipps from The A.V. Club wrote: "If director Jaume Collet-Serra set out to make a parody of horror film clichés, he succeeded brilliantly."

Accolades
This film won the International Feature Length Competition Golden Raven at the 2010 Brussels International Fantastic Film Festival. It was also nominated Choice Summer Movie: Drama at the 2009 Teen Choice Awards.

Controversy
The film's content, depicting a murderous adoptee, was not well received by adoption groups. The controversy caused filmmakers to change a line in one of their trailers from:  Melissa Fay Greene of The Daily Beast commented:  There is a pro-adoption service message on the DVD, advising viewers to consider adoption.

Prequel

In February 2020, development of a prequel film was announced, titled Esther, with William Brent Bell signed on as director from a script by David Coggeshall. The project will be a joint-venture between eOne and Dark Castle Entertainment and will be distributed by Paramount Pictures under its Players division. Alex Mace, Hal Sadoff, Ethan Erwin and James Tomlinson will produce the film, with David Leslie Johnson as an executive producer. Production was set to begin summer 2020. In October 2020, Julia Stiles said she was about to start working on the film. In November, the title was changed to Orphan: First Kill, with Isabelle Fuhrman returning to star in the film. The film was released on August 19, 2022.

References

External links

 
 
 

2009 films
2009 horror films
2009 psychological thriller films
2000s English-language films
2000s horror thriller films
2000s mystery horror films
2000s mystery thriller films
2000s psychological horror films
2000s serial killer films
American horror thriller films
American mystery horror films
American mystery thriller films
American psychological horror films
American psychological thriller films
American serial killer films
American Sign Language films
Appian Way Productions films
Canadian horror thriller films
Canadian mystery thriller films
Canadian psychological horror films
Canadian psychological thriller films
Canadian serial killer films
Dark Castle Entertainment films
English-language Canadian films
English-language French films
English-language German films
Films about adoption
Films about families
Films about orphans
Films directed by Jaume Collet-Serra
Films produced by Joel Silver
Films produced by Leonardo DiCaprio
Films scored by John Ottman
Films set in Connecticut
Films shot in Montreal
Films shot in Toronto
Films with screenplays by David Leslie Johnson-McGoldrick
French horror thriller films
French mystery thriller films
French psychological horror films
French psychological thriller films
French serial killer films
German horror thriller films
German mystery thriller films
German psychological thriller films
German serial killer films
Warner Bros. films
2000s American films
2000s Canadian films
2000s French films
2000s German films